Dictyodendrillidae is a family of sponges in the order Dendroceratida.

Species

 Genus Acanthodendrilla Bergquist, 1995
 Acanthodendrilla australis Bergquist, 1995
 Acanthodendrilla levii Uriz & Maldonado, 2000

 Genus DictyodendrillaBergquist, 1980
 Dictyodendrilla caespitosa (Carter, 1886)
 Dictyodendrilla cavernosa (Lendenfeld, 1888)
 Dictyodendrilla dendyi Bergquist, 1996
 Dictyodendrilla digitata (Lendenfeld, 1888)
 Dictyodendrilla massa (Carter, 1886)
 Dictyodendrilla nux (de Laubenfels, 1950)
 Dictyodendrilla pallasi (Ridley, 1884)
 Dictyodendrilla tenella (Lendenfeld, 1888)

 Genus Igernella Topsent, 1905 
 Igernella mirabilis Lévi, 1961
 Igernella notabilis (Duchassaing & Michelotti 1864)
 Igernella vansoesti Uriz & Maldonado, 1996

 Genus Spongionella Bowerbank, 1862
 Spongionella depressa Topsent, 1929
 Spongionella foliascens Kelly-Borges, Pomponi & Vacelet, 1993
 Spongionella gracilis (Vosmaer, 1883)
 Spongionella monoprocta Lévi, 1961
 Spongionella nigra Dendy, 1889
 Spongionella pulchella (Sowerby, 1804)
 Spongionella pulvilla (Dendy, 1905)
 Spongionella ramodigitata (Topsent, 1901)
 Spongionella regularis (Ridley, 1881)
 Spongionella repens (Thiele, 1905)
 Spongionella retiara (Dendy, 1916)
 Spongionella tubulosa Burton, 1937

References

Dendroceratida
Sponge families